The 2020–21 FC Schalke 04 season was the 117th season in the football club's history and 30th consecutive and 53rd overall season in the top flight of German football, the Bundesliga, having been promoted from the 2. Bundesliga in 1991. In addition to the domestic league, Schalke 04 also participated in this season's edition of the domestic cup, the DFB-Pokal. This was the 20th season for Schalke in the Veltins-Arena, located in Gelsenkirchen, North Rhine-Westphalia. The season covered the period from 1 July 2020 to 30 June 2021.

Schalke suffered a disastrous start to the season, becoming only the fifth Bundesliga team to go winless in their first 14 fixtures. They also became the first Bundesliga team with 5 managers in a season. Schalke's relegation was confirmed on the 20th of April, following a 1–0 defeat at Arminia Bielefeld.

Players
Note: Players' appearances and goals only in their Schalke career.

Transfers

In

Out

Club

Kit
Supplier: Umbro / Sponsor: Gazprom

Friendly matches

Competitions

Overview

Bundesliga

League table

Results summary

Results by round

Matches
The Bundesliga schedule was announced on 7 August 2020.

DFB-Pokal

Statistics

Squad statistics

Goalscorers

References

FC Schalke 04 seasons
Schalke